Catamaran Cruisers Ltd v Williams [1994] IRLR 384 is a UK labour law case, concerning redundancy.

Facts
Catamaran Cruises Ltd operated ferries and pleasure cruises on the Thames. French owners bought it following a near insolvency. Transport and General Workers' Union representatives had agreed new contract terms, offered to all employees. Seven claimants refused the new terms and were dismissed.

The Tribunal held the reason for offering the new terms was financial exigency, business efficiency and profitability and that the dismissals were unfair.

Judgment
Tudor Evans J held that a broader balancing test for what was "fair" was appropriate under ERA 1996 s 98(4) and that this dismissal was fair. He quoted with approval Balcombe J in Chubb Fire Security Ltd v Harper and said the following:

Notes

United Kingdom labour case law
Employment Appeal Tribunal cases
1994 in British law
1994 in case law